Partyzanske is a rural settlement in the Yalta Municipality of the Autonomous Republic of Crimea, a territory recognized by a majority of countries as part of Ukraine and annexed by Russia as the Republic of Crimea.

Its population was 94 in the 2001 Ukrainian census. Current population:

References

Rural settlements in Crimea
Yalta Municipality